Valerie Le Zimring-Schneiderman (born March 28, 1965 in Los Angeles) is a former Olympic rhythmic gymnast. She represented the United States at the 1984 Summer Olympics, and finished 11th in the individual all-around.

Early life

Zimring was born in Los Angeles, and lived in Cheviot Hills, Los Angeles. She attended UCLA for college and graduate school, earning a B.A as well as an M.A. in program-dance.

Career
At 11 years of age, Zimring learned she had a stress fracture in her back. Having just reached the Class I level in artistic gymnastics, she had to leave it to pursue rhythmic gymnastics, which she was still able to do.

Zimring was a member of the United States National Team for seven years (1979–85) and the USA World Championship team from 1981 to 1983. In 1982, she won the All-Around title at the U.S. Junior National Championship. She also won at the Austrian Invitational in 1983, becoming the first American to win an international Rhythmic Gymnastics competition.

She competed at the 1981 World Championships and the 1983 World Championships, finishing 44th and 48th in the all-around respectively. She was the 1984 National All-around Champion, qualifying to compete in the Olympics.

She represented the United States at the 1984 Summer Olympics, and finished 11th in the individual all-around. It was the best finish to date by an American in that event.

Zimring is Jewish, and won five gold medals at the 1985 Maccabiah Games in Israel.

Zimring coached the USA National Team in 1987–88.

Halls of Fame
She was inducted into the Southern California Jewish Sports Hall of Fame in 1990.  She was inducted into the USA Gymnastics Hall of Fame in 2007.

See also

List of Jewish gymnasts

References 

1965 births
Living people
American rhythmic gymnasts
Gymnasts at the 1984 Summer Olympics
Gymnasts from Los Angeles
Jewish gymnasts
Jewish American sportspeople
Olympic gymnasts of the United States
Maccabiah Games medalists in gymnastics
Maccabiah Games gold medalists for the United States
Competitors at the 1985 Maccabiah Games
University of California, Los Angeles alumni
21st-century American Jews
21st-century American women